Sawel Mountain is the highest peak in the Sperrin Mountains, and the 8th highest in Northern Ireland. It is also the highest mountain in Northern Ireland outside of the Mourne Mountain range located in County Down.

Geography
To the north of Sawel is County Londonderry, and to the south, County Tyrone. Around the peak, there is "montane heathland", with plant life including heather, bilberries and cowberries, although this is being damaged by hillwalking and grazing.

Naming
The Irish name of the mountain is a reference to a glen or hollow on the side of Sawel. It was also historically called Slieve Sawel, from the Irish word sliabh ("mountain").

Plane crash
On 5 January 1944 a Royal Navy Stinson Reliant (FK914) of 878 Naval Air Squadron was on a flight from RNAS Eglinton (HMS Gannet) to RNAS Machrihanish (HMS Landrail) when it crashed into Sawel Mountain in bad weather, killing all three crew. Due to snow drifts on the mountain the bodies of the crew weren't recovered until 29th January.

See also
Sliabh Beagh
Lists of mountains in Ireland
Lists of mountains and hills in the British Isles
List of Marilyns in the British Isles
List of Hewitt mountains in England, Wales and Ireland

References

Mountains and hills of County Londonderry
Mountains and hills of County Tyrone
Marilyns of Northern Ireland
Hewitts of Northern Ireland
Highest points of Irish counties
Geology of Northern Ireland
Mountains under 1000 metres
Aviation accidents and incidents locations in Northern Ireland